Sono solo fantasmi is a 2019 Italian horror comedy film directed by Christian De Sica.

Cast
Christian De Sica as Thomas
Carlo Buccirosso as Carlo
Gianmarco Tognazzi as Ugo
Leo Gullotta as the Sir
Francesco Bruni as Dante
Valentina Martone as Rosalia
Gianni Parisi as the notary
Claudio Insegno as the Egyptian

References

External links

2019 films
Films directed by Christian De Sica
Films set in Naples
Films shot in Naples
2010s Italian-language films
Italian comedy horror films
2019 comedy horror films
2010s Italian films